Roman Vladimirovich Gerus (born 14 September 1980) is a former Russian footballer.

Career
He made his debut in the Russian Premier League in 2001 for FC Chernomorets Novorossiysk.

External links
 
  Profile on the FC Rostov site

1980 births
People from Tikhoretsk
Living people
Russian footballers
FC Chernomorets Novorossiysk players
FC Luch Vladivostok players
FC Rostov players
Russian Premier League players
Association football goalkeepers
Russian expatriate sportspeople in Kazakhstan
Russian expatriate footballers
Expatriate footballers in Kazakhstan
FC Astana players
FC Amkar Perm players
FC Arsenal Tula players
Russian beach soccer players
FC Dynamo Bryansk players
Sportspeople from Krasnodar Krai